Step by Step is the fourth studio album by American boy band New Kids on the Block, released in June 1990 via Columbia Records.

Background and release
At the time of release the group was very popular and was being heavily merchandised, with everything from pillowcases, marbles, dolls, to a Saturday morning cartoon with their name and likeness. Before the album release Columbia Records received advance orders of more than two million copies of the album, and the demand put the company's pressing plants into overtime production. Step by Step went to number one on both the Billboard 200 and the UK Albums Chart, with the lead-off title track single topping the charts simultaneously and selling nearly three million copies, making it their highest selling single. Simultaneously with the release of the album, CBS Music Video put out the group's third home video, also called Step by Step, which had more than 500,000 advance orders, becoming the largest initial shipment of home videos of the company. In Brazil, the VHS sold over 10,000 copies, becoming a success in the country.

Another top ten single, "Tonight", followed, as the group embarked on their most ambitious world tour to date.  After having earned success with Hangin' Tough, the group took a more active role creatively on this album, co-writing and producing several of its tracks. They also started playing instruments on most of their songs.

By the end of 1990, despite the album having gone multi-platinum, the third and last single, "Let's Try It Again," was less successful and failed to crack the Billboard Hot 100 top fifty, and the album overall received lower certifications than Hangin' Tough in the United States.

Track listing

Charts

Weekly charts

Year-end charts

Certifications and sales

References

1990 albums
New Kids on the Block albums
Albums produced by Maurice Starr